In approximation theory, a Haar space or Chebyshev space is a finite-dimensional subspace  of , where  is a compact space and  either the real numbers or the complex numbers, such that for any given  there is exactly one element of  that approximates  "best", i.e. with minimum distance to  in supremum norm.

References 

Approximation theory